Paruchuri Venkateswara Rao (born 21 June 1944) and Paruchuri Gopala Krishna (born 25 September 1947), collectively referred to as the Paruchuri Brothers, are a screenwriting duo whose work is predominant as story writers, dialogue writers, actors, directors, poets, playwrights, and novelists in the Indian Telugu film industry.

They have written the stories and dialogues for over 358 films; to name a few E Charithra Ye Siratho, Naa Desam, Khaidi, Eenadu, Mundadugu, Bobbili Brahmanna, Prajaswamyam, Karthavyam, Varsham, Sarpayagam, Major Chandrakanth Samarasimha Reddy, Narasimha Naidu, Okkadu, Indra, Tagore, Manasantha Nuvve, Nee Sneham, Nuvvostanante Nenoddantana, Shankardada MBBS, Drushyam, Khaidi No. 150, Rudrama Devi and Sye Raa Narasimha Reddy.

Filmography

As directors (1984 – Present)
In 1984, both the brothers decided to direct films and their first film as directors under Srinadh movies was Kai Raja Kai. Later they directed total of 9 films, Bhale Thammudu, Sreekatnaleelalu, Repati Swarajyam, Praja Swamyamyam, Maa Telugu Talli, Maro Quit India, Sarpayagam and Singanna.

As writers

Awards, honors and recognitions

Nandi Awards
 Second Best Story Writer - Pratidhwani (1986)
 Best Story Writer - Karthavyam (1990)
 Best Story Writer  - Aasayam (1993)
 Best Supporting Actor for Paruchuri Venkateswara Rao - Aasayam (1993)
 Best Dialogue Writer - Nayudugari Kutumbam (1996)
 Best Dialogue Writer - Ganesh (1998)

Other Awards Best Dialogue Writers
 1982 Eenadu Sitara Award, Hyderabad
 1988 Prajaswamyam, Rasamayi,Tenali
 1990 Karthavyam, Kala Sagar Award, Madras
 1991 People’s Encounter, Kala Sagar, Madras
 1992 Sundarakanda, Lalita Kala Sagar, Chittoor
 1992 Peddarikam, Lyrics Award, Madras
 1993 Kunthi Puthrudu, Vamsi Berkley Award, Hyderabad
 1993 Major Chandrakanth, Kalasagar, Madras
 1996 Nayudugari Kutumbam, A.P. State Nandi Award
 1998 Ganesh, A.P. State Nandi Award
 1998 Ganesh, A.P. Cinegoers Award
 1998 Bavagaru Bagunnara, Vamsi Berkley Award
 1999 Samarasimha Reddy, AFJA Award
 1999 Samarasimha Reddy, Yuvakala Vahini Award
 1999 Samarasimha Reddy, A.P. Cinegoers Award
 2000 Azad, A.P. Cinegoers Award
 2001 Narasimha Naidu, Vamsi Directors Specials
 2002 Indra, A.P. Cinegoers Award
 2003 Tagore, A.P. Cinegoers Award
 2003 Tagore, Santosham Award
 2003 Tagore, Maa T.V. Award
 2003 Tagore, Bharatha Muni Award
 2004 Varsham, Santhosham Award
 2004 Sankardada MBBS, MAA T.V. Award
 2005 Suryam, Vamsi Berkley Award
 2006 Stalin, Santhosham Award
 Best Story Writer in 1990 for Karthavyam, Kalasagar, Madras
 Best Story Writer in 1993 for Aasayam, Cinegoers association, Hyderabad
 Best Screenplay Writer in 1990 for Kodama Simham,  Vamsi Berkley Awards

Best Film Directors
 Third Best Film Director in 1987 for Prajaswamyam, A.P. State Nandi Award

Special Jury Award
 Paruchuri Brothers were awarded with Special Jury Award for the year 2016, A.P. State Nandi Award

TV Awards
 Best Playlet writer award in A.P. State Nandi Drama Competition for the playlet "Sambhavami Pade Pade" in 2009
 Best Villain in comedy role for Sasirekha Parinayam movie in 2010, Gemini TV Film Awards
 Best Social Program Presenter award received for "Prajavedika" in 2011, Padmamohana TV awards
 Best Talk Show award for "Praja Vedika" in 2012, Gemini TV Awards
 Best Anchor award for "Praja Vedika" in 2012, Yuvakala Vahini
 Best Director award for Tele film "Sati Savitri" in 2014, Aradhana srikari ETV (Telecasted in 2013)
 Second Best Tele Film "Sathi Savithri", Copper Nandi and Commendation certificate to the director award for 2013 given in 2017 by AP State Government.

Honors and Felicitations
 Celebrate award in 2007 at "Telugu Chalana Chitra Vajrotsavam" (Diamond Jubilee)
  "Sensational Star Writers of the Decade" Award by Super Hit Magazine in 2010
 "Tv9 TSR Lalitha Kala Parishat" Best Story Dialogue Writers Award in 2010
 "Vishala Bharati Gaurav Satkar" award by Delhi Telugu Academy in 2007 for Script Writing
 "NTR Smaraka Purskara" Award for Contribution towards cinema in 2011, Hyderabad
 For completion of 200 films with the title ‘’’200 Not Out’’’ in 1992 at Ravindra Bharathi, Hyderabad
 For completing ‘’’Silver Jubilee’’’ in film writing successfully by "Singapore Telugu Association", Singapore in 2002
 For completing 25 years in film writing successfully by "TANA (Telugu Association of North America)" at San Jose, USA in 2003
 For completing 25 years in film writing successfully by "ETA (European Telugu Association)" at Birmingham, UK in 2003
 Aatreya Award title by "Abhinandhana Cultural Association"
  Visista Sodharulu title by "Padma Mohana" in 2004
  Gangi Reddy Memorial International Spiritual Award, Vishakapatnam in 2009
 "Viswa Vikhyata Rachana Sarwabhoumulu" title (Birudu) by "T. Subba Rami Reddy Lalitha Kala Parishath" on the occasion of completing 333 films in 33 years for 3 Generations in 2011
 100 years of SIFCC (South India Film Centenary Celebrations) film festival at Chennai in 2013
  Dr. Allu Ramalingaiah National Award at Vijayawada in 2014
 Dasari Smarakam Writer Award by Santotsham at 15th Santosham Film Awards  in 2017
 Life Time Achievement Award by Kakatiya Kala Sevasamithi, Hyderabad in 2017
 TAAI Award In recognition of services to Telugu Language by Telugu Association of Australia, Melbourne in 2017
 Life Time Achievement Award by Telugu Association Inc, Sydney in 2017

References 

Telugu screenwriters
Living people
People from Krishna district
Indian screenwriting duos
Screenwriters from Andhra Pradesh
Indian male screenwriters
20th-century Indian dramatists and playwrights
21st-century Indian dramatists and playwrights
20th-century Indian male writers
21st-century Indian male writers
Year of birth missing (living people)
Santosham Film Awards winners
Nandi Award winners
CineMAA Awards winners
Sibling duos
Sibling filmmakers
Filmmaking duos